The 1994 Copa del Rey was the 56th edition of the Spanish basketball Cup. It was organized by the ACB and it Final Eight was played at Palacio de San Pablo, in Seville, between 3 and 6 March 1994.

This edition was played by the 20 teams of the 1993–94 ACB season. The four first qualified teams of the previous season qualified directly to the Final Eight while teams 5 to 8 joined the competition in the third round. In the draw of the first round, two teams received a bye.

First round
Teams #2 played the second leg at home.

|}

Second round

|}

Third round

|}

Final Eight Bracket

Final
The 1994 Copa del Rey Final started with 45-minutes delay due to problems in one of the rims. In the game, Tony Massebunrg (FC Barcelona) was disqualified in the first minute of the game after punching Ramón Rivas. Ten minutes later, Ken Bannister (Taugrés Baskonia) was also disqualified after attacking Quique Andreu.

MVP of the Tournament: Velimir Perasović

References

External links
Boxscores at ACB.com
Linguasport

Copa del Rey de Baloncesto
1993–94 in Spanish basketball